The Waikato Times is a daily newspaper published in Hamilton, New Zealand and owned by media business Stuff Ltd. It has a circulation to the greater Waikato region and became a tabloid paper in 2018. 

The newspaper has won the title of New Zealand Newspaper of the Year (in the category of up to 30,000 circulation) for two consecutive years: 2018 and 2019.

History 
The Waikato Times started out as the tri-weekly Waikato Times and Thames Valley Gazette, first published by George Jones on 2 May 1872 in Ngāruawāhia but moved to Hamilton in 1875. It was then managed by Messrs Langbridge, Silver, E. M. Edgecumbe, George Edgecumbe and J. S. Bond, who ran a book and stationery shop and changed the Times from tri-weekly to a penny daily in 1896, using Press Association news.

For 20 years it competed with the Waikato Argus, until the papers merged in 1915. The paper changed from afternoon to morning production from 5 September 2011, though had changed its Saturday issue in 2003.

The Times had an audited net daily circulation of 11,633 copies at March 2021. 

 Allan Hawkey produces opinion cartoons for the newspaper.

Papers Past has 2 May 1872 to 31 December 1892 issues in a searchable form on-line. Hamilton reference library has microfilm copies of the Waikato Argus (29 Aug 1896 – 27 December 1902, 23 January 1903 – 30 April 1909, 1 June 1909 – 4 December 1914) and Waikato Times from 1872. The paper is also included on the Stuff.co.nz website.

Community newspapers
The Hamilton Press is a weekly newspaper, delivered on Wednesdays, in the city of Hamilton. It is one of many free weekly, or bi-weekly Neighbourly newspapers, which, since 2014, have been printed by Stuff. They also include Cambridge Edition, Franklin County News, Matamata Chronicle, Piako Post (Morrinsville-Te Aroha area), South Waikato News and Taupō Times.

Awards and nominations 

In 2017, Waikato Times journalist Aaron Leaman was the joint winner of the Senior nib Health Journalism Scholarship at the Voyager Media Awards. Leaman also won Regional Journalist of the Year at the same event.

In 2018, Waikato Times journalist Ruby Nyika won Student Journalist of the Year at the Voyager Media Awards. The same year, Donna-Lee Biddle was runner-up for the Regional Journalist of the Year Award, and won the award for Feature writing - crime, justice and / or social issues.

In 2019, Waikato Times columnist Max Christoffersen won the Opinion Writing (General) Award at the Voyager Media Awards. Christoffersen had died two months prior to the awards ceremony.

References

External links
 Waikato Times website
 Waikato Times viewer

Publications established in 1872
Newspapers published in New Zealand
Mass media in Hamilton, New Zealand
Stuff (company)

Waikato
1872 establishments in New Zealand